Elsie Pemberton Leach MBE (30 June 1888 – 9 May 1968) was an ornithologist and pioneer bird-ringer in Britain. She served as the founding and honorary Secretary of the Bird-Ringing Committee in 1937 and continued to work on ringing until 1963.

Born in Plymouth, the younger daughter of Sir Edward Pemberton Leach, Elsie grew up in a well-connected family that moved across the United Kingdom. From an early age, she was introduced to outdoor pursuits, riding, fishing, and hunting. An interest in birds was sparked off through her friendship with Emma Louisa Turner which led to a meeting with H. F. Witherby in 1930. At that time Witherby was working on the establishment of a marking scheme for British Birds and she took responsibility for the Ringing Scheme in 1937. Her skills at ringing and care in maintaining records were well known and her memory and ability to recall recoveries helped in her work.  She compiled recovery records and produced annual reports from 1938 and went on to produce them until 1951. She retired in 1953 but continued to work on ringing until 1963 when the ringing office shifted to Tring. Her work was recognized by the award of the Bernard Tucker Medal and she was made Member of the Order of the British Empire.

References

1888 births
1968 deaths
Members of the Order of the British Empire
20th-century British zoologists
British ornithologists
Scientists from Plymouth, Devon